Park Street is a small but historic road in the center of Boston, Massachusetts. It begins at the top of Beacon Hill, at the intersection of Beacon Street, where it is lined up with the front of the Massachusetts State House. It then spills down the hill toward Tremont Street, with Boston Common to its west.

History
Park Street was laid out in 1804, initially as Park Place, replacing the previous Sentry Street.

In the 1880s, the feminist Woman's Journal was published on Park Street.  Houghton Mifflin was also headquartered here beginning in the late 19th century.

Gallery

See also
 Park Street District
 Boston Common
 The Massachusetts State House
 Park Street Church
 Park Street (MBTA station), the first subway station in the United States, is located at the corner of Park and Tremont Streets and is a major transfer point between the Red and Green rapid transit lines.
 No. 9 Park
 Amory-Ticknor House
 Union Club of Boston
 Fox 25 News studios, built to include the State House as its backdrop
 Paulist Center & Chapel

References

Streets in Boston
Beacon Hill, Boston